Maria Haglund (born 6 May 1972) is a Swedish sprint canoer and marathon canoeist who competed in the 1990s. She won a bronze medal in the K-4 500 m event at the 1992 Summer Olympics in Barcelona.

Haglund also won ICF Canoe Sprint World Championships with three silver medals (K-2 5000 m: 1991, K-4 500 m: 1993, 1998) and three bronze medals (K-4 200 m: 1995, 1997; K-4 500 m: 1994).

References
DatabaseOlympics.com profile

Sports-reference.com profile

1972 births
Canoeists at the 1992 Summer Olympics
Living people
Olympic canoeists of Sweden
Olympic bronze medalists for Sweden
Swedish female canoeists
Olympic medalists in canoeing
ICF Canoe Sprint World Championships medalists in kayak
Medalists at the 1992 Summer Olympics
20th-century Swedish women